National Financial Credit Bank SA (NFCB) is a commercial bank in Cameroon. It is one of the fourteen licensed commercial banks in the country.

History
NFCB was formed in 1989 as National Finance Credit Company' (NFCC). Since its inception, NFCC functioned as a savings and credit institution. In 2006, NFCC received a full banking license and rebranded to its current name. Upon the direction of the Central Bank of Central African States, Loita Capital Partners International, a Mauritius-based investment banking company, was invited to invest in NFCB and provide technical and expert guidance during the transition from a savings and credit institution to a fully fledged commercial bank.
It was founded by an Oshie man from West Cameroon by the name of Awanga

Branches
, NFCC maintained seven networked branches across Cameroon.

External links
 Website of Loita Capital Partners International Limited

See also

 List of banks in Cameroon
 Economy of Cameroon

References

Banks of Cameroon
Banks established in 1989